TEAM for a Livable Vancouver (TEAM) is a municipal political party in Vancouver, British Columbia, Canada. It was established by Vancouver city councillor Colleen Hardwick, first elected in 2018 with the Non-Partisan Association (NPA), and a group of citizens from across the political spectrum who shared Hardwick's concerns about the nature and direction of city policies regarding budget priorities, property development, and engagement with residents and neighbourhoods.

History
The party derives its name from former mayor Art Phillips' The Electors' Action Movement (TEAM). The new party held a conference in 2021 to develop policy directions, which were later ratified by the membership.

Hardwick was acclaimed as TEAM's 2022 mayoral candidate in March 2022. At a general meeting on June 11, TEAM members nominated six candidates for city council: Cleta Brown, Sean Nardi, Param Nijjar, Grace Quan, Stephen Roberts and Bill Tieleman. Brown made a previous run for council in 2014 as a Green Party candidate, and Roberts ran provincially with the BC Liberals. Longtime NDP strategist Tieleman told The Georgia Straight that TEAM "will make affordable housing, public safety and city services and livability the priority". 

TEAM has been described as a centre-right party; however, some have also identified it as centrist, big tent, or syncretic, given its platform favouring vacancy control and use of city land to build affordable housing, and its refusal to accept personal election contributions from major corporate property developers.

Electoral results

References

External links 
 

Municipal political parties in Vancouver
Political parties established in 2021
Conservative parties in Canada